The United Kingdom Comic Art Convention (UKCAC) was a British comic book convention which was held between 1985 and 1998. As a complement to UKCAC, from 1990 to 1995 the organizers put on the Glasgow-based Glasgow Comic Art Convention (GlasCAC), generally held in the spring.

The largest convention of its kind in the country during the period, the UKCAC and GlasCAC were the sites of annual comics award ceremonies from 1987 to 1998. The UKCAC was the site of the Eagle Awards presentation from 1987 to 1990; the UK Comic Art Awards were presented at one of the conventions — often GlasCAC — from 1991 to 1997; and the National Comics Awards were presented at the UKCAC in 1997–1998.

Most editions of the UKCAC took place in September, over two days, usually on a Saturday and Sunday. The convention featured floorspace for exhibitors, including comic book dealers and collectibles merchants. Along with panels, seminars, and workshops with comic book professionals, one of the annual highlights (until 1989) was the Saturday all-night film show, as well as regular events like quizzes, a fancy dress contest, and a charity auction. The show included an autograph area, as well as a so-called "Artists' Alley" where comics artists signed autographs and sold or did free sketches.

History
UKCAC was a successor to the British Comic Art Convention (commonly known as "Comicon,") which ran, mostly in London, from 1968 to 1981. UKCAC was organised as a nonprofit convention "by the fans for the fans" starting in 1984. The original organizers were Frank Plowright, Hassan Yussuf, and Chris Savva (who actually organized the first convention). Many others contributed either for a few years or on the convention days themselves (most prominent was Richard Barker, between 1986 and 1990). The initial show, in September 1985, attracted more than 500 attendees.

The 1988 convention featured more than 30 comics professionals, and had panels on Harvey Kurtzman (in attendance), comic book printing, politics in comics, violence in comics, and technology. After four conventions, the annual UKCAC charity auction had raised over £15,000.

In 1989 organizers Plowright, Yusuf, and Barker converted the UKCAC to an event generating a salary (mostly as a way to keep the show running and fairly compensate them for the work of organizing it) under the name Rusty Staples. The 1989 UKCAC was co-sponsored by Marvel Comics, Neptune Comic Distributors, and 2000 AD Comics Group. It featured an exhibit on the work of the late Frank Bellamy (an exhibit which had originated in The Basement Gallery in Brixton).

The first Glasgow Comic Art Convention was held in Spring 1990 at Glasgow City Chambers and featured the first presentation of the UK Comic Art Awards, a comics award voted on by British creators, editors, and retailers. The award was created by Rusty Staples and sponsored by Penguin Books UK.

The 1990 London show was co-sponsored by DC Comics among others; attendance was around 5,000 people.

As the years went by, Plowright and Yusuf became the main organizers. London became an increasingly expensive location to host the convention, and they had difficulty keeping costs down and attracting top-level guests. As a result, attendance declined. The UKCAC was held in London until 1997, and in Manchester in its final iteration in 1998.

Legacy 
UKCAC was succeeded by Comic Festival, run in Bristol from 1999 to 2004; and then by Comic Expo, also in Bristol, which ran from 2004 to 2014.

Locations and dates

Glasgow Comic Art Convention locations and dates

References

External links 
 British Convention Booklets, including covers from UKCAC programmes from 1985 to 1994
Alan Davis UKCAC programme pages
 Miller, Glenn. "The Rise and Fall of the UK Comic Art Convention," My Little Underground (May 26, 2013)

British fan conventions
Defunct comics conventions
Recurring events established in 1985
Recurring events disestablished in 1998
1985 establishments in the United Kingdom